Matthew Dickey (born November 18, 1989) is an American basketball player who is best known for his collegiate career at the University of North Carolina at Asheville (UNC Asheville). A 6'1" point guard, Dickey guided the Bulldogs to consecutive NCAA Tournament berths in 2011 and 2012. As a senior in 2011–12 he was named the Big South Conference's Player of the Year; he led the team with a 16.1 points per game average en route to conference regular season and conference tournament championships. UNC Asheville set a school record with 24 wins that year.

College career
Lightly recruited out of Hewitt-Trussville High School in Trussville, Alabama, Dickey only received scholarship offers from Belmont, Morehead State, Wofford, and UNC Asheville. After accepting the scholarship to UNC Asheville, Dickey contributed right away by averaging 10.9 points per game during his freshman season.

Over the course of Dickey's college career he would go on to increase his scoring average each season. His coach, Eddie Biedenbach, credited his hard work for the improvement. By the time Dickey was a senior he averaged a team-leading 16.1 points per game and guided them to their second straight NCAA Tournament appearance. In the 2012 tournament, UNC Asheville came extremely close to becoming the first team in history to win as a #16-seed after losing to #1-seed Syracuse 72 to 65. That game was the last of Dickey's collegiate career. He finished with 1,778 points, which is a school record for career points in their Division I era.

Professional career
Dickey went undrafted in the 2012 NBA draft. On November 2, 2012, he was drafted in the 3rd round of the 2012 NBA D-League Draft by the Rio Grande Valley Vipers. However, he was waived on November 21. On January 12, 2013, he was acquired by the Texas Legends. On January 29, he was waived by the Legends after playing in 6 games. On April 4, 2013, he was acquired by the Los Angeles D-Fenders.

The Basketball Tournament
In 2017, Dickey played for The CITI Team of The Basketball Tournament. The Basketball Tournament is an annual $2 million winner-take-all tournament broadcast on ESPN.

Outside of basketball
In May 2013, shortly after the D-League season ended, Dickey traveled to Honduras with Crossfire Ministries. It inspired him to possibly head to seminary school and become a full-time minister. He coached at Westbrook Christian School located in Rainbow City, Alabama. He is now a student minister at First Baptist Church Trussville.

References

External links
NBA D-League Profile
UNC Asheville profile
College statistics @ sports-reference.com
NBA Development League statistics @ basketball-reference.com

1989 births
Living people
American men's basketball players
Basketball players from Alabama
Los Angeles D-Fenders players
People from Trussville, Alabama
Point guards
Texas Legends players
UNC Asheville Bulldogs men's basketball players